Entity integrity is concerned with ensuring that each row of a table has a unique and non-null primary key value; this is the same as saying that each row in a table represents a single instance of the entity type modelled by the table. A requirement of E. F. Codd in his seminal paper is that a primary key of an entity, or any part of it, can never take a null value.
The relational model states that every relation (or table) must have an identifier, called the primary key (abbreviated PK), in such a way that every row of the same relation be identifiable by its content, that is, by a unique and minimal value. The PK is a not empty set of attributes (or columns). The same format applies to the foreign key (abbreviated FK) because each FK matches a preexistent PK. Each of attributes being part of a PK (or of a FK) must have data values (such as numbers, letters or typographic symbols) but not data marks (also known as NULL marks in SQL world). 
Morphologically, a composite primary key is in a "steady state": If it is reduced, PK will lose its property of identifying every row of its relation but if it is extended, PK will be redundant.

See also
Domain integrity
Referential integrity
Null (SQL)

References

Data modeling
Data quality